Vanavara is a rural locality (a selo) in Evenkiysky District of Krasnoyarsk Krai, Russia, located on the Podkamennaya Tunguska River at the mouth of the local Vanavarki River. Population: 

Vanavara is notable for being the nearest populated place to the site of the 1908 Tunguska event.

History
The locality as it exists today was founded in 1932 as a base for herders, hunters, and fishermen, as well as a location for a weather station.

A plane crash occurred  on September 26, 1994, when a plane flying from Krasnoyarsk to Tura had diverted to Vanavara Airport due to bad weather: on running out of fuel the crew then attempted an emergency landing on the bank of the Chamba River 41 km from Vanavara centre. All twenty-four passengers and four crew died in the crash.

On December 10, 2010, an explosion occurred in a boiler in the heating plant in Vanavara. A fireman was killed in the incident and heating was cut off for 720 houses, forcing the evacuation of many children to Krasnoyarsk. Heating has since been fully restored.

Transportation
The locality is served by Vanavara Airport.

Climate
Vanavara has a subarctic climate (Köppen climate classification Dfc). Precipitation is moderate and is somewhat higher in summer than at other times of the year.

References

Rural localities in Krasnoyarsk Krai
Road-inaccessible communities of Krasnoyarsk Krai
Evenkiysky District